Thomas Thompson (1832 – 21 January 1919) was a New Zealand politician of the Liberal Party.

Biography

Early life and career
Thompson was born in Ireland in 1832 where he was entered the grocery trade as a merchant. In 1853 he shifted to Australia during the gold rush in Victoria. Then he moved to Auckland in the 1860s and carried on a grocery business there.

During the New Zealand Wars Thompson saw service with the volunteers in 1863. He received a commission as a lieutenant in 1867.

In local matters Thompson served as a member of the Road Board, Domain Board and School Committee of Mount Eden. In 1878 he was elected a member of Auckland City Council, retaining his seat until 1884, also representing the Council on the Auckland Harbour Board.

Member of Parliament

He was Minister of Justice from 2 March 1896 to 23 January 1900 and Minister of Defence from 22 June 1896 to 23 January 1900 in the Liberal Government.

He was appointed to the Legislative Council on 18 March 1903 and his appointment was renewed on 18 March 1910; his term ended on 17 March 1917.

Later life and death
Thompson died in Mount Eden, Auckland, on 21 January 1919, and was buried at Purewa Cemetery.

Notes

References

1832 births
1919 deaths
Irish emigrants to New Zealand (before 1923)
British military personnel of the New Zealand Wars
Members of the Cabinet of New Zealand
Members of the New Zealand Legislative Council
New Zealand defence ministers
New Zealand Liberal Party MPs
New Zealand Liberal Party MLCs
Burials at Purewa Cemetery
Members of the New Zealand House of Representatives
New Zealand MPs for Auckland electorates
19th-century New Zealand politicians
Auckland Harbour Board members
Justice ministers of New Zealand